The Balfour Day riots, took place between 2 and 3 November 1945. The riots began as anti-Jewish demonstrations on the 28th anniversary of the Balfour Declaration. Rallies were organised by the right-wing Young Egypt Party and Hassan al-Banna's Muslim Brotherhood.

Five Egyptian Jews and one Muslim policeman were killed in Alexandria, hundreds were injured in both Alexandria and Cairo, and an Ashkenazi synagogue was burned down. The Greek Orthodox patriarchate, Catholic churches and a Coptic school were also damaged in the riot. The police reacted quickly but were unable to prevent much of the violence. However further demonstrations planned for the following day were largely suppressed.

Following the riots, King Farouk of Egypt denounced the violence and met with Rabbi Chaim Nahum, whilst Prime Minister Mahmoud an-Nukrashi Pasha also denounced the violence and visited a number of the riot sites, although Nukrashi cast blame on Zionists for having "provoked such violent reactions"

Aftermath

Gudrun Krämer writes that: "Yet in spite of the Balfour Day riots of November 1945 and some isolated incidents occurring in their wake, the mass of the Egyptian population did not show signs of anti- Jewish feeling. The anti-Zionist campaign of militant nationalist and Islamic groups with its anti- Jewish overtones did not seem to affect the general public, nor did it lead to any government action directed against Egyptian Jews."

Numerous acts of violence against Egyptian Jews followed in the later years, including the 1948 bombings of Jewish areas, which killed 70 Jews and wounded nearly 200, while riots claimed many more lives. In 1949, a bombing in the Cairo Jewish quarter killed 34 and wounded 80. During the 1950s, the Jews of Egypt were subjected to political instability due to ongoing Israeli-Egyptian conflict (particularly the Suez Crisis) and suffered sporadic violence, leading to the exodus of most of the community.

See also
1945 Tripoli pogrom
Antisemitism in the Arab world#Egypt

Citations 

Mass murder in 1945
1945 in Egypt
1945 murders in Egypt
1940s in Cairo
Anti-Jewish pogroms by Muslims 1941-49
Anti-Jewish pogroms by Muslims
Antisemitism in Egypt
1945 riots
November 1945 events in Africa
Riots and civil disorder in Egypt
Religiously motivated violence in Egypt
Jews and Judaism in Alexandria
Jews and Judaism in Cairo
1945 in Judaism
Massacres in 1945